The Bié Plateau or Central Plateau of Angola is a plateau that occupies most of central Angola. The elevation of the plateau is from 1,520 m to 1,824.8956 m. 

Several major rivers originate from the plateau such as the Cunene River, the Kuanza River,  and the Kwango River. Its climate is cool and has enough rainfall to allow for the cultivation of coffee, corn, rice, sisal, sugarcane, and peanuts. Along the more elevated parts, more rain falls, but it gradually declines further within. About half of the rural population of Angola reside on the Bié plateau. The Benguela Railway connects it to the ocean and its principal towns are Huambo and Kuito.

Plateaus of Angola